Washington County USD 108 is a public unified school district headquartered in Washington, Kansas, United States.  The district includes the communities of Washington, Greenleaf, Haddam, Mahaska, Morrowville, and nearby rural areas.

Schools
The school district operates the following schools:
 Washington County Jr/Sr High School
 Washington Elementary School

History
It was formed in 2006 by the consolidation of North Central USD 221 and Washington USD 222.

See also
 Kansas State Department of Education
 Kansas State High School Activities Association
 List of high schools in Kansas
 List of unified school districts in Kansas

References

External links
 

School districts in Kansas
School districts established in 2006
2006 establishments in Kansas